The PCE-842-class patrol craft were United States Navy patrol craft escorts designed during World War II that were intended for coastal and convoy escort. At 185 feet long and 640 tons, the PCE is more than twice the displacement of the PC and thus and in combination with a less powerful engine also much slower. It has a crew complement of 99 officers and men.

Development and design
An escort derivative of the new design was proposed for supply under the Lend-Lease scheme to Britain's Royal Navy (which had already rejected the Admirable class as minesweepers), and when the United States Navy realized that a shortage of engines might prevent it from receiving additional s beyond those already on order, it was decided to build the escort variant, designated as Patrol Craft Escort (PCE) for both the US Navy and Royal Navy.

Displacement was  standard and  full load. They were powered by two  General Motors 12-278A diesel engines driving two shafts via single reduction gearing.

The normal armament on completion consisted of a single  gun forward, two 40 mm anti-aircraft guns, backed up by 4 or 5 Oerlikon 20 mm cannon. A Hedgehog anti-submarine mortar was mounted between the 3 inch gun and the ship's bridge, while depth charge projectors and rails were mounted on the ships' fantail. Later ships were fitted with a third Bofors gun and additional Oerlikons, while ships were later modified to mount three twin Bofors mounts and four Oerlikons. Some ships (including PCE-867) were armed with two 3-inch guns and three Oerlikons.

Detection equipment
The class was fitted with radar, sonar and other detection equipment for ASW.

Conversions
Some PCEs were later converted to Rescue Escorts, PCE(R), and to Amphibious Control Vessels, PCE(C), which were used in many U.S. amphibious landing operations during World War II, especially Leyte Gulf and Normandy. Two such ships, which were converted to Rescue Escorts, were the USS Somersworth and USS Fairview, both of which were present at the surrender of Japan in Tokyo Bay on September 2, 1945.

Production
Sixty-eight Patrol Craft Escorts were built for the US Navy, and seventeen were delivered under the Lend-Lease Program to Allies during World War II.  The PCEs proved to be an inexpensive substitute for larger and more valuable destroyers and destroyer escorts in convoy escort work.

Philippine Navy
The PCE is the most numerous major ship class of the Philippine Navy that, at one time, numbered more than ten vessels.

Ships

68 boats listed: 827 ... 860, 867 ... 886, 891 ... 904

Citations

Sources

External links

http://www.navsource.org/archives/12/02idx.htm
http://www.ww2pcsa.org/patrol-craft.html

 
World War II patrol vessels of the United States
Patrol boat classes